Frederick Harry Sales ( Walker; 27 November 1920 – 15 November 1994) was an English comedian and actor.

Life 
He was born in Hull, Yorkshire, into a show business family, and took the surname Sales from that of his paternal grandmother.  He began performing in theatres in his teens, and worked extensively in Ireland where he developed his act as a comedian.  Part of his performance involved him acting as a baby in an oversized playpen, banging his "'poon".  He toured internationally, entertaining the forces in the Second World War and visiting Australia and elsewhere.

He appeared regularly on radio shows such as Variety Bandbox and Workers' Playtime in the late 1940s and 1950s, and also visited the United States, performing as part of a revue in Las Vegas.  In the late 1950s he took a leading role in the television adaptation of Educating Archie.

He died in Epsom, Surrey, in 1994, aged 73.

References

External links
 

1920 births
1994 deaths
English radio personalities